Milan Jarý (born 30 April 1952) is a Czech former cross-country skier. He competed in the men's 15 kilometre event at the 1976 Winter Olympics.

References

External links
 

1952 births
Living people
Czech male cross-country skiers
Olympic cross-country skiers of Czechoslovakia
Cross-country skiers at the 1976 Winter Olympics
People from Rokytnice nad Jizerou
Sportspeople from the Liberec Region